Lemaître coordinates are a particular set of coordinates for the Schwarzschild metric—a spherically symmetric solution to the Einstein field equations in vacuum—introduced by Georges Lemaître in 1932. Changing from Schwarzschild to Lemaître coordinates removes the coordinate singularity at the Schwarzschild radius.

Equations 

The original Schwarzschild coordinate expression of the Schwarzschild metric, in natural units, is given as

where
 is the invariant interval;
 is the Schwarzschild radius;
 is the mass of the central body;
 are the Schwarzschild coordinates (which asymptotically turn into the flat spherical coordinates);
 is the speed of light;

This metric has a coordinate singularity at the Schwarzschild radius .

Georges Lemaître was the first to show that this is not a real physical singularity but simply a manifestation of the fact that the static Schwarzschild coordinates cannot be realized with material bodies inside the Schwarzschild radius. Indeed, inside the Schwarzschild radius everything falls towards the centre and it is impossible for a physical body to keep a constant radius.

(the numerator and denominator are switched inside the square-roots), leads to the Lemaître coordinate expression of the metric,

where

The trajectories with ρ constant are timelike geodesics with τ the proper time along these geodesics. They represent the motion of freely falling particles which start out with zero velocity at infinity. At any point their speed is just equal to the escape velocity from that point.

In Lemaître coordinates there is no singularity at the Schwarzschild radius, which instead corresponds to the point . However, there remains a genuine gravitational singularity at the center, where , which cannot be removed by a coordinate change.

The Lemaître coordinate system is synchronous, that is, the global time coordinate of the metric defines the proper time of co-moving observers. The radially falling bodies reach the Schwarzschild radius and the centre within finite proper time.

Along the trajectory of a radial light ray,

therefore no signal can escape from inside the Schwarzschild radius, where always
 and the light rays emitted radially inwards and outwards both
end up at the origin.

See also
Kruskal-Szekeres coordinates
Eddington–Finkelstein coordinates
Lemaître–Tolman metric
Introduction to the mathematics of general relativity
Stress–energy tensor
Metric tensor (general relativity)
Relativistic angular momentum

References

Metric tensors
Spacetime
Coordinate charts in general relativity
General relativity
Gravity
Exact solutions in general relativity